Bodmin is a town in Cornwall, England, UK.

Bodmin may also refer to:

Places
 Bodmin, Saskatchewan, a hamlet in Canada
 Bodmin Moor, in Cornwall

Politics
 Bodmin (UK Parliament constituency), a historic UK parliamentary constituency
 1906 Bodmin by-election
 1922 Bodmin by-election

People
 Robert Robartes, Viscount Bodmin (1634–1682), an English diplomat and politician

Other
 Bodmin manumissions, a 9th-century manuscript
 Bodmin Riding, a custom in Bodmin